Bondage is a 2006 drama film written and directed by Eric Allen Bell, his feature film debut. The film was selected to premiere at the 2006 South by Southwest Film Festival.

Premise
Bondage is the story of a youth from Orange County, California, who escapes an abusive home environment but ends up in juvenile detention and a psychiatric center.

Cast
 Michael Angarano as Charlie
 Illeana Douglas as Elaine Edwards
 Griffin Dunne as Dr. Simon
 Sean Berdy as Young Trey
 Eric Lange as Bob Edwards
 Evan Ellingson as Mark Edwards
 Mae Whitman as Angelica
 Andy Dick as Stewart
 Rocky Marquette as Richard
 Michael K. Williams as Willie
 Ezra Buzzington as Fred
 Robert Zepeda as Reyes
 Jose Pablo Cantillo as Spider
 Kevin Derkash as Vincent
 Shant Marashlian as Hamid
 Paul Peglar as Dennis
 Wes Robinson as Mike Lozano
 Sam Upton as Max
 Shane Baumel as Young Charlie

References

External links
 Official MySpace site
 
 

2006 films
2006 drama films
American drama films
Films set in California
2000s English-language films
2000s American films